Vallis Ex Umbra De Mortuus (Latin for "The Valley of the Shadow of Death") is the third studio album by the American funeral doom band Rigor Sardonicous. It was released in 2008 on Paragon Records.

The album's vinyl edition contains a cover of the song "Mad World" by English pop rock band Tears for Fears.

Track listing

Vinyl bonus track

Personnel
Joseph J. Fogarazzo – guitars, vocals
Glenn Hampton – vocals, guitars, bass

References

External links
 Encyclopedia Metalllum 
 Diabolical Conquest
 RYM page

2008 albums
Rigor Sardonicous albums
Paragon Records albums